Elmo Heinonen (born 2 April 1997) is a Finnish professional footballer who plays for SalPa, as a forward.

Club career
On 29 November 2021, he agreed to return to his first club SalPa.

References

1997 births
Living people
Finnish footballers
Salon Palloilijat players
Ekenäs IF players
FC Honka players
Turun Palloseura footballers
Kakkonen players
Veikkausliiga players
Ykkönen players
Association football forwards
People from Salo, Finland
Sportspeople from Southwest Finland